The 1999 Internazionali di Tennis di San Marino was a men's tennis tournament played on outdoor clay courts in City of San Marino, San Marino that was part of the World Series of the 1999 ATP Tour. It was the 11th edition of the tournament and was held from 9 August until 15 August 1999. Unseeded Galo Blanco won the singles titles.

Finals

Singles

 Galo Blanco defeated  Albert Portas, 4–6, 6–4, 6–3
 It was Blanco's only singles title of his career.

Doubles

 Lucas Arnold Ker /  Mariano Hood defeated  Petr Pála /  Pavel Vízner, 6–3, 6–2

References

External links
 ITF tournament edition details

Campionati Internazionali di San Marino
San Marino CEPU Open
1999 in Sammarinese sport